Blue Valley Center for Advanced Professional Studies (CAPS) is a high school program which operates multiple different magnet programs for students who live within the Blue Valley School District, regardless of whether they attend a Blue Valley school. Each course takes one semester and takes up half of the student's day, with the rest of their time spent at their home high school.

Courses and Clubs

Accelerator
 Global Food Industries
 Innovate

Biosciences
Molecular Medicine and Bioengineering
Environmental Science
Bioscience Research
CAPS Bioclub

Business, Technology, and Media
Global Business
World Language & Business Leadership
Digital Design and Photography
Filmmaking
Multimedia Journalism
Technology Solutions

Engineering
Engineering
FIRST Robotics Competition Team 2410

Human Services
American Justice: for All
Teacher Education

Medicine & Healthcare
Foundations of Medicine I 
Foundations of Medicine II
Sports Medicine
Exploring Health Professions

Robotics
In 2010, FRC Team 2410, named the Metal Mustangs, from Blue Valley North High School moved to the facility. Since then, two FIRST Tech Challenge teams have also been started, named the Cobalt Colts FTC 6547 and Metal Mavericks FTC 11874. The Cobalt Colts won the 2019 FTC World Championship.

References

Public high schools in Kansas
Educational institutions established in 2010
Education in Overland Park, Kansas
Schools in Johnson County, Kansas
2010 establishments in Kansas
Special schools in the United States